Aglaops is a genus of moths of the family Crambidae.

Species
Aglaops aurantialis (Munroe & Mutuura, 1968)
Aglaops genialis (Leech, 1889)
Aglaops homaloxantha (Meyrick, 1933)
Aglaops youboialis (Munroe & Mutuura, 1968)

References

Pyraustinae
Crambidae genera
Taxa named by William Warren (entomologist)